is a Japanese manga series written and illustrated by Kiri Wazawa. An anime television adaptation aired from June to September 2016. A second season aired from January to March 2019.

Characters

Ashiya is a high school student who was possessed by a fuzzy demon as he is starting his first day of high school which made him extremely ill. He enlists the help of Abeno to exorcise the demon but ends up working for Abeno to pay off his debt. A crybaby but kind-hearted boy, he seems to hold a mysterious power that has yet to be revealed in the manga series.

A first year high school student in the same class as Ashiya. He is the current owner of the Mononokean and rumors around the demon world state he killed the original owner Aoi, though this is false. He can open up two portals a day to the underworld to exorcise demons, but this severely drains him of energy. He is usually shown sleeping in class. He has blond hair and because of his maturity most people are surprised he is a first year high school student. He believes that helping demons is more important than helping humans, as demons are lonely in the Human world where very few humans can see them and because he believes if humans are in trouble they can receive help easily, unlike demons. He is stern and short tempered and a bit rude particularly towards Ashiya but shows a kinder personality as the series progresses. He is polite to his customers. He has begun to loosen up as he becomes friends with Ashiya.

A 15-year-old girl with a born poker face and who was raised in a temple. She believed her father would not let her inherit the temple because she was a girl but Ashiya helps her realize it was not that, but because her father wanted her to have other options and not feel forced to take over the temple. While she initially could not see demons, after Yahiko bites her she is able to see him and Fuzzy but has a harder time seeing other demons. She is good friends with Ashiya, Abeno and Yahiko.

A small adorable fluffy white demon with small stubby legs, three tails, and purple eyes. He is very affectionate towards Ashiya, having been noticed by him and inadvertently cursed him by clinging to him, causing Ashiya to feel nauseous and become gravely ill. He was lonely in the mundane world where no one could see him so was happy to have Ashiya notice him. He has also been shown to be intelligent and affectionate towards Abeno, and will defend his friends if they are harmed.

A fox demon who was Abeno's friend since eight years ago and who kidnapped him so that they could play with him for three days. He bit Zenko to get Abeno's attention by threatening to burn her arm off but he apologized and now has to serve in her temple for a year as punishment (though he mostly lounges around and does nothing). He is very childish and can turn himself into the form of a small boy and also likes sweets and Abeno (and gets along with Zenko) but does not like Ashiya.

Koura is the demon who runs the Kiyakudo medicine shop in the Underworld with her assistant Shizuku. She has a fascination with humans' body parts as she says she can make great medicine with them. She is also friends with Abeno (who is a regular customer) and the Legislator. She is also extremely kind and loyal to her assistant Shizuku, who is in love with her.

The Legislator's little sister and also Koura's assistant in the medicine shop Kiyakudo which is located the Underworld. She is practicing her magic, so she mostly appears human but retains her newt's tail. She is also in love with her master Koura and is a loyal and hardworking employee.

The Legislator is one of the three heads of the Underworld (the other two being Justice and the Executive). He sets the rules of the Underworld and is the only one who has the authority to give the Master of the Mononkean Abeno direct orders which he must follow. If a Master of the Mononokean fails to follow an order/rule set by the Legislator he forfeits his position. He was once described by Abeno as a chain-smoking, sex maniac with a gambling problem. The Legislator is also Shizuku's older brother who is apparently in love with her. He carries out his duties from his home on Newt Lake.

He is a student in Class 1-2 and friends with Hanae Ashiya and Haruitsuki Abeno.

Media

Manga
Kiri Wazawa launched the series in online Square Enix's Gangan Online magazine in September 2013 and ended in April 2021. The series is published digitally in English by Crunchyroll Manga.

Volume list

Anime
A 13-episode anime television series adaptation was announced by Square Enix on 11 February 2016. The series is directed by Akira Iwanaga and written by Takao Yoshioka, with animation by the studio Pierrot Plus. Yasuharu Takanashi composed the music. Character designs for the anime were provided by Atsuko Kageyama. Crunchyroll simulcasted the first season, while Funimation released the series in North America. The series aired between 28 June 2016 to 21 September 2016, and was broadcast on AT-X, Tokyo MX, Yomiuri TV, Chukyo TV, and BS11.

A 13-episode second season was announced, and aired from 5 January 2019 to 30 March 2019. Itsuro Kawasaki replaced Akira Iwanaga as the director, and Mizuki Aoba replaced Atusko Kageyama as the character designer. The cast reprised their roles. Crunchyroll simulcast the second season, while Funimation produced an English dub.

Season 1

Season 2

Reception
Gadget Tsūshin listed "melon soda", a phrase from the ending theme, in their 2019 anime buzzwords list.

References

External links
  
  
  at Crunchyroll
 

Anime series based on manga
Comedy anime and manga
Funimation
Crunchyroll anime
Gangan Online manga
Japanese webcomics
Studio Signpost
Supernatural anime and manga
Webcomics in print